Secret Rocks may refer to:
Secret Rocks, South Australia, a locality on northeastern Eyre Peninsula in South Australia
Secret Rocks Nature Reserve, a private nature reserve on the former pastoral lease of the same name